Soloella is a genus of moths in the family Erebidae erected by Max Gaede in 1926.

Species
 Soloella guttivaga (Walker, 1854)
 Soloella orientis Kühne, 2007

References

 Kühne, L. (2007). "A new snouted tiger species from Eastern Africa (Lepidoptera, Aganaidae)". Esperiana memoir. (3): 351–352. 

Aganainae
Moth genera